In enzymology, a kojibiose phosphorylase is an enzyme that catalyzes the chemical reaction

2-alpha-D-glucosyl-D-glucose + phosphate  D-glucose + beta-D-glucose 1-phosphate

Thus, the two substrates of this enzyme are kojibiose and phosphate, whereas its two products are D-glucose and beta-D-glucose 1-phosphate.

This enzyme belongs to the family of glycosyltransferases, specifically the hexosyltransferases.  The systematic name of this enzyme class is 2-alpha-D-glucosyl-D-glucose:phosphate beta-D-glucosyltransferase.

References

 
 

EC 2.4.1
Enzymes of unknown structure